Sini A Markose (Sinimole Paulose) is an Indian middle distance runner born in Pampakuda, Ernakulam district of Kerala state, who had won 39 international medals and participated in three Asian Games (2006, 2010 & 2014) in her athletic career so far.

She conferred with the prestigious Arjuna Award for her outstanding performance in the field of Athletics in 2009.

Her major accolades include Five Asian Championship Titles (indoor &  outdoor) in 800m and 1500m running and an Asian Games Bronze medal in 1500m running.

In 2010 she was 9th at the Commonwealth Games in the 800 metres.

She is the current Asian Indoor Athletics Championships Record holder in 800m & 1500m running.

Major International Medals

No.	Event	1500 m	800 m
1	 Asian Indoor Games , Thailand, 2005                              	Bronze	
2	Asian Indoor championships , Thailand, 2006                   	Gold-New Asian  Record	Silver
3	Asian Games , Doha, 2006                                             	Bronze	
4	Asian Grandprix -I, Bangkok, 2007	Gold	
5	Asian Grandprix -II, Gowhati, 2007	Gold	
6	Asian Grandprix -III, Pune, 2007	Gold	
4	Asian Track & Field  Championships, Jordan, 2007                                      	Gold	Silver
6	Asian Indoor Games,Macau,China, 2007	Gold	Silver
7	Asian Indoor Championships, Doha, 2008 	Gold-New Asian Record	Gold-New Asian Record
8	South Asian Championships,Cochin, 2008	Gold	Gold- Best Athlete
9	Asian All Star Meet  Bhopal, 2008                               	Gold	
10	British MC Gold  Race,Watford,UK, 2008		Gold
11	European Granprix,Stockholm,Sweden, 2008		Bronze
12	 European Grand Prix,Cork,Irland, 2008	Gold	
13	Asian All Star Meet ,Delhi, 2010   	Gold	Silver
14	Asian Grandprix - Thailand , 2012		Silver
15	Savo Games , Laphinlahthi, Finland, 2012	Silver 	
16	Savo Games , Laphinlahthi, Finland, 2013		Bronze
17	Memmorial Rasschert , Ninove, Belgium, 2013		Gold
18	Kuortane Games , Finland , 2013	Bronze	
19	Flanders Cup, Huizingen, Belgium, 2014		Gold
20	Brussels Grand Prix, Brussels , Belgium, 2014	Silver 	
21	Kuortane Games , Finland , 2014		Silver
22	Asian Games, Incheon , 2014                                      	4th

References

1983 births
Living people
Malayali people
Sportswomen from Kerala
Recipients of the Arjuna Award
Athletes (track and field) at the 2008 Summer Olympics
Olympic athletes of India
Indian female middle-distance runners
21st-century Indian women
21st-century Indian people
People from Ernakulam district
Asian Games medalists in athletics (track and field)
Athletes (track and field) at the 2006 Asian Games
Athletes (track and field) at the 2010 Asian Games
Athletes (track and field) at the 2014 Asian Games
Asian Games bronze medalists for India
Medalists at the 2006 Asian Games